Andriy Valerianovych Sagaidakovsky (born April 17, 1957, in Lviv) is a Ukrainian artist, participant of the Ukrainian New Wave. He works in the field of painting and practices unusual techniques, such as painting on rugs. Andriy is one of the most ironic contemporary Ukrainian artists, who finds unusual perspectives on everyday topics.

Solo exhibitions

1992 - Warsaw, "Laboratoriya" Gallery.
1997 - Lviv, "Dzyga" Art Center.
1999 - Kyiv, "Yavna tayemnytsya." Center for Contemporary Art.
2001 - Lviv, Museum of the History of Religion.
2006 - Lublin, "Terytoriyi." 
18.09.2020 - 24.01.2021 - Kyiv, Art Arsenal, "Andrii Sahaidakovskyi. Scenery. Welcome!"

See also
Mystetskyi Arsenal National Art and Culture Museum Complex

References

Sources 
Сусак В. Андрій Сагайдаковський // Реанімація. Проект. Альбом Львівської галереї мистецтв. — Львів : Львівська галерея мистецтв, 2007. — С. 46.
Скляренко Г. Про складність простих речей: Андрій Сагайдаковський // Сучасне мистецтво України. Портрети художників. — Київ : ArtHuss, 2016. — С. 213–228. — .

Ukrainian painters
Ukrainian contemporary artists
1957 births
Artists from Lviv
Living people